Liquid manure is a mixture of animal waste and organic matter used as an agricultural fertilizer, sometimes thinned with water. It can be aged in a slurry pit to concentrate it.

Liquid manure was developed in the 20th-century as an alternative to fermented manure. Manure in both forms is used as a nutrient-enriched fertilizer for plants, containing high levels of nitrogen, phosphorus, and potassium present in farm animals' excretions and originating from the food they consume.

History
Amy Bogaard, an archaeobotanist at the University of Oxford, suspects that even as early as the Stone Age farmers had noticed the improved fertility of manured land. Her team investigated European digs for crops of cereals such as wheat and barley, as well as pulses such as peas and lentils. Modern-day scholars think that the Babylonian Chronicles and Egyptian hieroglyphs report manuring practices, while Pliny the Elder and Seneca the Younger describe similar Roman and Teuton practices.

Current American fertilizer practice dates back to the Post–World War II economic expansion era. Powerful motorised tractors allowed farmers to haul large, heavy tanks on trailers around their fields, allowing liquids such as liquid manure to be easily and evenly applied near the plant root. Professional liquid manure spreaders may be costly and may require adherence to strict regulations, which has made renting the equipment attractive to some farmers.

Role in disease transmission
Since at least 1982, health authorities have recognised that the O157:H7 bacteria, which has been responsible for significant numbers of human deaths, spreads through fecal transmission. The strain's low infectious dose, survival under adverse conditions, and potential for extreme disease severity prompt scientific attention. Radish, alfalfa sprouts, green onions as well as leafy green vegetables like lettuce, spinach are prone to be disease vectors, particularly when they are exposed to the pathogen just prior to harvest. In 1998, the United States Food and Drug Administration published the Guide to Minimize Microbial Food Safety Hazards for Fresh Fruits and Vegetables. Particular attention is paid to concentrated animal feeding operations (CAFOs) because they are the source of most of the liquid manure that is spread on fields of vegetables in the United States. Rainwater runoff from these CAFOs was identified in the fatal Walkerton E. coli outbreak as the contaminant of municipal wellwater used for human consumption. Because of the relative infancy of industrial-scale vegetable fertilization by liquid manure, processes to minimize the infection risks were not final by 2007.

Gallery

See also
 Chicken manure
 Cow manure
 Manure spreader
 Slurry pit
 Feces

References

External links

Organic fertilizers
Animal waste products
Biogas substrates
Feces
Soil improvers
Escherichia coli
Foodborne illnesses
Manure